Some Girls (formed in 2001) is an American indie rock trio composed of Juliana Hatfield (guitar and vocals), Heidi Gluck (electric bass guitar, keyboard, harmonica, lap steel guitar, and vocals) and Freda Love Smith (drums and vocals).  Hatfield and Love Smith knew each other from the Blake Babies and wanted to write songs together. The group's songs are generally melodic, upbeat, and lighthearted.

The group released their first album, Feel It, in 2003 and toured the United States. Their second album, Crushing Love, was released in July 2006 on Koch Records. The release includes a DVD containing tour and studio footage.

Discography

Studio albums

Singles

References

External links
 

American indie rock groups
All-female bands